Dave Mills was an English singer.

He had an international hit with "Love is a Beautiful Song". which went gold in Australia. Other charting singles in South Africa include "Theresa", "All The Tears In The World", "Home", "I Can't Go Home To Mary", "Tomorrow is Over" and "Mexico". All these songs were written by Terry Dempsey who won the SARI for best song for "Home".

In 1970 he won the SARI awards for best male singer and Country and Western singer. By 1973 he had moved to Australia.

Discography

Albums

Singles

References

Living people
20th-century British male singers
20th-century Australian male singers
1935 births